Pearl Iannelli Chanda (born 11 March 1994) is an English actress.

Early life
Chanda was born in Balham, in the south London Borough of Wandsworth. She is of Italian and Indian descent. She attended the BRIT School, a specialist performing arts school in Croydon. She graduated with a Bachelor of Arts degree in acting from the Royal Academy of Dramatic Art (RADA) in 2013.

Career
Chanda gained prominence through her work in theatre, making her stage debut in 2013 as Nina in the Headlong production of The Seagull. The following year, she made her television debut with a guest appearance in an episode of the BBC One soap opera Holby City. She played Julia in the 2014 Royal Shakespeare Company production of The Two Gentlemen of Verona.

Chanda appeared in the 2015 ITV miniseries Arthur & George as Maud Edalji. That same year, she had stage roles in Crave at the Crucible Theatre in Sheffield, The Angry Brigade at the Bush Theatre in London, and The Glass Menagerie at the Nuffield Theatre in Southampton. This was followed by roles in Ink at the Almeida and Duke of York's Theatre in 2017, One for Sorrow at the Royal Court Theatre in 2018, and Three Sisters in 2019, also at the Almeida. Meanwhile, she had a small role in Motherland on BBC Two.

In 2020, Chanda played DC Laura Simpson in the first series of the ITV crime drama McDonald & Dodds, and Nilufer in two episodes of Michaela Coel's BBC One limited series I May Destroy You. She also had a film role in the horror film Marionnette. Chanda joined the main cast of the British-French science fiction production War of the Worlds for its second and third series, as Zoe.

Chanda played Cassie in the stage adaptation of The Taxidermist's Daughter at the Chichester Festival Theatre in 2022. She appears in the 2022 mystery comedy film See How They Run as Sheila Sim. Chanda was able to discuss the role and character with Sim’s son Michael Attenborough whom Chanda had worked with previously.

Filmography

Film

Television

Stage

References

External links

Living people
1994 births
people from Balham
Actresses from London
Alumni of RADA
British actresses of Indian descent
English people of Italian descent
English people of Indian descent
English Shakespearean actresses
English stage actresses
People from the London Borough of Wandsworth
People of Campanian descent